Lego Loco is a Lego-branded virtual world game for Microsoft Windows, released in November 1998. It is a simple open-ended construction game with an emphasis on Rail Transport. The aim of the game is to construct a town in which Lego minifigures can live. This was the first game released by Lego Media, the publishing division of The Lego Group that was founded after the commercial success of Mindscape's Lego Island.

Gameplay 

At the start of the game, the player is bestowed with a "Toy Box", from which they can select different parts from lists and place them directly into the space provided. They can place down roads, railway lines, stations, crossings, buildings, and scenery. To start the simulation, the player must close the Toy Box, and the town will come to life (though the player can open it again to make changes, save the town, or open a new one). After a while Lego figures will begin moving into the houses provided (if any), and the player can, like with ordinary figures, pick them up and place them elsewhere. This can affect the figure's mood, depending on where it's placed.

Using the train house (engine shed), the player can create trains to run on the railway lines. If a train has passenger carriages it will stop at any stations that have been placed alongside the track.  The player can control the train's speed and direction and add a mail carriage to the train, thus enabling it to stop at post offices and carry postcards that have been created by the player.  The train or trains can also go through tunnels that the player can place at the edge of the map, and some tunnels can be used to help exchange postcards with other players (provided a network has been set).

References

1998 video games
God games
Loco
Multiplayer and single-player video games
Video games developed in the United Kingdom
Video games scored by Richard Joseph
Windows games
Windows-only games